Camp Rock 2: The Final Jam (Original Motion Picture Soundtrack) is the soundtrack album from the 2010 Disney Channel television film of the same name. The album was released on August 10, 2010, by Walt Disney Records. The album debuted at number three on Billboard 200 albums chart with over 41,000 copies sold in the first week.

Singles
 "Wouldn't Change a Thing" by Demi Lovato and Joe Jonas was released on July 23, 2010, as the lead single from the album. The song was written and produced by Adam Anders, Nikki Hassman and Peer Åström.

Promotional singles
 "Can't Back Down" by Demi Lovato, Alyson Stoner and Anna Maria Perez de Tagle was released on May 10, 2010, as the first promotional single from the album. The song was written by Antonina Armato, Tim James and Tom Sturges and produced by Armato and James.
 "It's On" by the cast of Camp Rock 2: The Final Jam was released on May 18, 2010, as the second promotional single. The song was written by Lyrica Anderson, Kovasciar Myvette and Toby Gad and produced by Gad. A music video for the song premiered on Disney Channel on May 14. It would also be used prominently for the channel's Summer campaign that year. A second music video premiered on May 24, featuring the titular characters from Phineas and Ferb creating a Flash mob on Santa Monica Pier. The song would later be used by ABC to promote their Sunday Fun & Games (consisting of Celebrity Family Feud, The 100,000 Prymaid, and Match Game) 6 years later.
 "Fire" by Matthew "Mdot" Finley was released on June 24, 2010, as the third promotional single. The song was written by Anderson and Dapo Torimiro (who also served as the song's producer).

Critical reception

Stephen Thomas Erlewine of AllMusic gave a review: "Camp Rock 2 finds the Jonas Brothers and Demi Lovato joined by R&B singer Matthew "Mdot" Finley, who gives this collection of Disney bubblegum a slightly different flavor".

Commercial performance
The album debuted at number 3 on the Billboard 200 chart.

Track listing

Personnel 
Credits

 Demi Lovato - vocals
 Nick Jonas - vocals
 Joe Jonas - vocals
 Kevin Jonas - vocals
 Alyson Stoner - vocals
 Meaghan Martin - vocals
 Iron Weasel - vocals
 Jordan Francis - vocals
 Matthew "Mdot" Finley - vocals
 Roshon Fegan - vocals
 Anna Maria Perez de Taglé - vocals
 Joel Soyffer - mixing
 Brian Malouf - mixing
 Stephen Marcussen - mastering
 Steven Vincent - music executive
 Steve Sterling - design
 Steve Gerdes - creative direction
 Tom Sturges - composition
 Pamela Sheyne - composition
 Steve Rushton - composition
 Joacim Persson - composition
 Kovasciar Myvette - composition

 Niclas Molinder - composition
 Aaron Dudley - composition
 Lyrica Anderson - composition
 Johan Alkenäs - composition
 Aristeidis Archontis - mixing, composition, production
 Peer Astrom - mixing, composition, production
 David Bellochio - mixing, composition, production
 Andy Dodd - mixing, composition, production
 Toby Gad - mixing, composition, production
 Jamie Houston - mixing, composition, production
 Tim James - mixing, composition, production
 Dapo Torimiro - mixing, composition, production
 Adam Watts - mixing, composition, production
 Mitchell Allen Scheer - composition, producer
 Adam Anders - composition, producer
 Antonina Armato - composition, producer
 Kara DioGuardi - composition, producer
 Nikki Hassman - composition, producer
 Jeannie Lurie - composition, producer
 Chen Neeman - composition, producer
 Stacy Wilde - composition, producer

Charts

Weekly charts

Year-end charts

Certifications and sales

Footnotes

References

External links
 Camp Rock 2: The Final Jam official website

2010 soundtrack albums
Soundtrack 2
Disney film soundtracks
Walt Disney Records soundtracks
Television soundtracks
Cast recordings
Albums produced by Toby Gad